Werner Hans Erhard (born John Paul Rosenberg; September 5, 1935) is an American author and lecturer known for founding est, which operated from 1971 to 1984. He has written, lectured, and taught on self-improvement.

In 1977 Erhard, with the support of John Denver, Robert W. Fuller and others, founded The Hunger Project, an NGO accredited by the United Nations in which more than four million people have participated with the goal of establishing "the end of hunger as an idea whose time has come".

In 1991 Erhard retired from business and sold his existing intellectual property to his employees, who then adopted the name Landmark Education, renamed in 2013 Landmark Worldwide.

Early life
John Paul Rosenberg was born in Philadelphia, Pennsylvania, on September 5, 1935. His father was a small-restaurant owner who left Judaism for a Baptist mission and then joined his wife in the Episcopal Church, where she taught Sunday School. They agreed that their son should choose his religion when he was old enough. He chose to be baptized in the Episcopal Church, served there for eight years as an acolyte, and has been an Episcopalian since.

Rosenberg attended Norristown High School in Norristown, Pennsylvania, where he received the English award in his senior year. He graduated in June 1953, along with his future wife Patricia Fry, whom he married on September 26, 1953; they had four children.

From the early mid-1950s until 1960, Rosenberg worked in various automobile dealerships (starting at a Ford dealership where he was trained by Lee Iacocca, then Lincoln Mercury, and finally Chevrolet), with a stint managing a nearly defunct medium-duty industrial equipment firm, which became successful under his management.

In 1960, Rosenberg left Patricia and their children in Philadelphia, traveled to Indianapolis with June Bryde, and changed his name to "Werner Hans Erhard"; he chose the name from Esquire magazine articles he had read about West German economics minister Ludwig Erhard and physicist Werner Heisenberg. Bryde changed her name to Ellen Virginia Erhard. The Erhards moved to St. Louis, where Werner took a job as a car salesman.

Patricia Rosenberg and their four children initially relied on welfare and help from family and friends. After five years without contact, Patricia Rosenberg divorced Erhard for desertion and remarried.

In October 1972, a year after creating Erhard Seminars Training, Erhard contacted his first wife and family, arranged to provide support and college education for the children, and repaid Patricia's parents for their financial support. Between 1973 and 1975, members of his extended family took the est training, and Patricia and his younger siblings took jobs in the est organization.

Career

Parents Magazine Cultural Institute
In 1961, Erhard began selling correspondence courses in the Midwest. He then moved to Spokane, Washington] where he worked at Encyclopædia Britannica's "Great Books" program as an area training manager. In January 1962, Erhard began working at Parents Magazine Cultural Institute, a division of W.R. Grace & Co. In the summer of 1962, he became territorial manager for California, Nevada, and Arizona, and moved to San Francisco and in the spring of 1963 to Los Angeles. In January 1964, Parents transferred him to Arlington, Virginia as the southeast division manager, but after a dispute with the company president, he returned to his previous position as west coast division manager in San Francisco. Over the next few years, Erhard brought on as Parents staff many people who later became important in est, including Elaine Cronin, Gonneke Spits, and Laurel Scheaf.

Influences

While largely self-educated, Erhard was influenced by or worked closely with philosophers, leadership and business academics, physicists, and Zen masters. Philosopher Michael E. Zimmerman said of Erhard, "He had no particular formal training in anything, but he understood things as well as anyone I'd ever seen; and I've been around a lot of smart people in academia." During his time in St. Louis, he read two books that had a marked effect on him: Think and Grow Rich by Napoleon Hill (1937) and Psycho-Cybernetics by Maxwell Maltz (1960). When a member of his staff at Parents Magazine introduced him to the ideas of Abraham Maslow and Carl Rogers, both key figures in the Human Potential Movement, he became more interested in personal fulfillment than sales success.

After moving to Sausalito, he attended seminars by Alan Watts, a Western interpreter of Zen Buddhism, who introduced him to the distinction between mind and self; Erhard subsequently became close friends with Watts. Erhard also studied in Japan with Zen rōshi Yamada Mumon. In Bartley's biography, Werner Erhard: The Transformation of a Man, the Founding of est (1978), Bartley quotes Erhard as acknowledging Zen as an essential contribution that "created the space for" est.

Erhard attended the Dale Carnegie Course in 1967. He was sufficiently impressed by it to make his staff attend the course, and began to think about developing a course of his own. Over the following years, Erhard investigated a wide range of movements, including Encounter, Transactional Analysis, Enlightenment Intensive, Subud and Scientology.

In 1970 Erhard became involved in Mind Dynamics and began teaching his own version of Mind Dynamics classes in San Francisco and Los Angeles. The directors of Mind Dynamics eventually invited him into their partnership, but Erhard rejected the offer, saying he would rather develop his own seminar program—est, the first program of which he conducted in October 1971. John Hanley, who later founded Lifespring, was also involved at this time. In their 1992 book Perspectives on the New Age, James R. Lewis and J. Gordon Melton write that Mind Dynamics, est, and LifeSpring have "striking" similarities, as all used "authoritarian trainers who enforce numerous rules," require applause from participants, and de-emphasize reason in favor of emotion. The authors also describe graduates recruiting heavily on behalf of the companies, thereby eliminating marketing expenses.

est (1971–1984)
Starting in 1971, est, short for Erhard Seminars Training and Latin for "it is", offered in-depth personal and professional development workshops, the initial program of which was called "The est Training". The est Training's purpose was to transform the way one sees and makes sense of life so that the situations one had been trying to change or tolerating clear up in the process of living itself. The point was to leave participants free to be, while increasing their effectiveness and the quality of their lives. The est Training was experiential and transformational in nature.

The workshops were offered until 1984, when the est training was replaced by the Forum. As of 1984, 700,000 people had completed the est training. American ethicist, philosopher, and historian Jonathan D. Moreno has described the est training as "the most important cultural event after the human potential movement itself seemed exhausted" and a form of "Socratic interrogation". Erhard challenged participants to be themselves and live in the present instead of playing a role imposed on them by their past, and to move beyond their current points of view into a perspective from which they could observe their own positionality. The author Robert Hargrove said "you're going to notice that things do begin to clear up, just in the process of life itself".

The first est course was held in San Francisco, California, in October 1971. Erhard led all the early est courses himself, but by the mid-1970s he had trained ten others (doctors, attorneys, and businessmen and -women) to do so. Est centers opened in Los Angeles; Aspen, Colorado; Honolulu; New York City; and other cities, and est was enthusiastically endorsed by celebrities and people of influence such as leadership and business academic Warren Bennis, philosopher Walter Kaufmann, social activist Jerry Rubin, business magnate David Geffen, author and businesswoman Arianna Huffington, artist and peace activist Yoko Ono, singer-songwriter John Denver, and actress Valerie Harper.

Werner Erhard Foundation (1973–1991)
In the early 1970s, the est Foundation became the Werner Erhard Foundation, with the aim of "providing financial and organizational support to individuals and groups engaged in charitable and educational pursuits—research, communication, education, and scholarly endeavors in the fields of individual and social transformation and human well-being." The foundation supported projects launched by people committed to altering what is possible for humanity, such as The Hunger Project, The Mastery Foundation, The Holiday Project, and the Youth at Risk Program, programs that continue to be active. It also organized presentations by scholars and humanitarians such as the Dalai Lama and Buckminster Fuller and hosted an annual conference in theoretical physics, a science in which Erhard was especially interested. The annual conference was designed to give physicists an opportunity to work with their colleagues on what they were developing before they published, and was attended by such physicists as Richard Feynman, Stephen Hawking, and Leonard Susskind.

Werner Erhard and Associates (1981–1991) and "The Forum"

In the 1980s Erhard created a new program called the Forum, which began in January 1985. Also during that period he developed and presented a series of seminars, broadcast via satellite, that included interviews with contemporary thinkers in science, economics, sports, and the arts on topics such as creativity, performance, and money.

In October 1987 Erhard hosted a televised broadcast with sports coaches John Wooden, Red Auerbach, Tim Gallwey and George Allen to discuss principles of coaching across all disciplines. They sought to identify distinctions found in coaching regardless of the subject being coached. Jim Selman moderated the discussion and in 1989 documented the outcome in the article "Coaching and the Art of Management."

Subsequent work
After retiring from Werner Erhard & Associates, Erhard continued to make public appearances. One of these was the Larry King Live episode "Whatever Happened to Werner Erhard?" Erhard participated via satellite from Moscow, where he was working with the All Union Knowledge Society and a number of the members of the newly formed Russian parliament. During this time he worked on peace and reconciliation in Northern Ireland, and on some occasions with author Peter Block.

Erhard has devoted his time to scholarly research, writing, and teaching his ideas on integrity, leadership, performance, and transformation. He authored a paper on integrity with Michael C. Jensen and Steve Zaffron. Author Bartley J. Madden wrote of Erhard's, Jensen's, and their colleagues' new paradigm of individual, group, and organizational performance that it "emphasizes how one's worldview shapes and constrains each individual's perceptions. The paradigm takes one to the source of performance, which is not available by merely explaining performance through linear cause and effect analysis", that "the source of performance resides in how actions correlate naturally with the way circumstances occur", and that "language (including what is said and unsaid in conversations) plays a dominant role in how situations occur and so is instrumental in improving performance".

A major part of Erhard's current work is devoted to the creation and development of the course "Being a Leader and the Effective Exercise of Leadership: An Ontological/Phenomenological Model", which he and his colleagues have led at numerous universities and which is taught by 34 professors at their schools. The Financial Times management editor Andrew Hill wrote that the course contributes to the field of business education and furthers academic research.

Erhard is the author of the final chapter of Hayek: A Collaborative Biography, a book about economist Friedrich Hayek, edited by Robert Leeson.

Critics and disputes 
Erhard became the object of popular fascination and criticism, with the media tending to vilify him over several decades. Moreno has written, "Allegations of all sorts of personal and financial wrongdoing were hurled at him, none of which were borne out and some [of which] were even publicly retracted by major media organizations." Various skeptics have questioned or criticized the validity of Erhard's work and his motivations. Psychiatrist Marc Galanter called Erhard "a man with no formal experience in mental health, self-help, or religious revivalism, but a background in retail sales". Michael E. Zimmerman, chair of the philosophy department at Tulane University, wrote "A Philosophical Assessment of the est Training", in which he calls Erhard "a kind of artist, a thinker, an inventor, who has big debts to others, borrowed from others, but then put the whole thing together in a way that no one else had ever done." Sacramento City College philosophy professor Robert Todd Carroll has called est a "hodge-podge of philosophical bits and pieces culled from the carcasses of existential philosophy, motivational psychology." Social critic John Bassett MacCleary called Erhard "a former used-car salesman" and est "just another moneymaking scam." NYU psychology professor Paul Vitz called est "primarily a business" and said its "style of operation has been labeled as fascist."

In 1991, Erhard "vanished amid reports of tax fraud (which proved false and won him $200,000 from the IRS) and allegations of incest (which were later recanted)." The March 3, 1991, episode of 60 Minutes covered these allegations and was later removed by CBS due to factual inaccuracies. On March 3, 1992, Erhard sued CBS, San Jose Mercury News reporter John Hubner and approximately 20 other defendants for libel, defamation, slander, invasion of privacy, and conspiracy. On May 20, 1992, he filed for dismissal of his own case and sent each of the defendants $100 to cover their filing fees in the case. Erhard told Larry King in an interview that he dropped the suit after receiving legal advice telling him that in order to win it, he would have to prove not just that CBS knew the allegations were false but that CBS acted with malice. Erhard told King that his family members had since retracted their allegations, which according to Erhard had been made under pressure from the 60 Minutes producer.

Erhard's daughters retracted the allegations of sexual abuse they had made against him. Celeste Erhard, one of the daughters featured on 60 Minutes, sued Hubner and the San Jose Mercury News for $2 million, accusing the newspaper of having "defrauded her and invaded her privacy", saying she had exaggerated information, been promised a $2 million book deal, and appeared on 60 Minutes to get publicity for the book. Celeste claimed that her quotes in the Mercury News article were deceitfully obtained. The case was dismissed in August 1993, the judge ruling that the statute of limitations had expired, that Celeste "had suffered no monetary damages or physical harm and that she failed to present legal evidence that Hubner had deliberately misled her", which is legally required for damages.

CBS subsequently withdrew the video of the 60 Minutes program from the market. A disclaimer said, "this segment has been deleted at the request of CBS News for legal or copyright reasons".

In 1992 a court entered a default judgment of $380,000 against Erhard in absentia in a case alleging negligent injury. The appellate court stated that he had not been personally served and was not present at the trial.

In 1993 Erhard filed a wrongful disclosure lawsuit against the IRS, asserting that IRS agents had incorrectly and illegally revealed details of his tax returns to the media. In April 1991, IRS spokesmen were widely quoted alleging that "Erhard owed millions of dollars in back taxes, that he was transferring assets out of the country, and that the agency was suing Erhard", branding Erhard a "tax cheat". On April 15, the IRS was reported to have placed a lien of $6.7 million on Erhard's personal property. In his suit Erhard stated that he had never refused to pay taxes that were lawfully due, and in September 1996 he won the suit. The IRS paid him $200,000 in damages. While admitting that the media reports quoting the IRS on Erhard's tax liabilities had been false, the IRS took no action to have the media correct those statements.

A private investigator quoted in the Los Angeles Times stated that by October 1989, Scientology had collected five filing cabinets' worth of materials about Erhard, many from certain graduates of est who had joined Scientology, and that Scientology was clearly in the process of organizing a "media blitz" aimed at discrediting him. According to Erhard's brother Harry Rosenberg, "Werner made some very, very powerful enemies. They really got him."

Impact 
According to a 2012 article in Financial Times, Erhard's influence "extends far beyond the couple of million people who have done his courses; there is hardly a self-help book or a management training programme that does not borrow some of his principles." In 1995, Fortune magazine's 40th anniversary issue wrote that Erhard's ideas about methods for empowering people were one of the major innovations in management thinking of the previous two decades. Erhard's work has impacted millions of people's lives through his programs for individuals, organizations and business leaders. His work has been cited as having a significant cultural impact on America in the 1970s. Erhard's teachings have influenced the field of professional coaching and been noted as having a positive impact on society.

Other organizations

The Hunger Project

In 1977, with the support of John Denver, former Oberlin College president Robert W. Fuller, and others, Erhard founded The Hunger Project, a nonprofit NGO accredited to the United Nations Economic and Social Council in which more than 4 million people have participated, with the goal of ending hunger within 25 years. Erhard wrote the Hunger Project source document "The End of Starvation: Creating an Idea Whose Time Has Come."

Landmark Education 
In 1991, the group that later formed Landmark Education purchased the intellectual property of Erhard. In 1998, Time magazine published an article about Landmark Education and its historical connection to Erhard. The article stated that: "In 1991, before he left the U.S., Erhard sold the 'technology' behind his seminars to his employees, who formed a new company called the Landmark Education Corp., with Erhard's brother Harry Rosenberg at the helm." Landmark Education states that its programs have as their basis ideas originally developed by Erhard, but that Erhard has no financial interest, ownership, or management role in Landmark Education. In Stephanie Ney v. Landmark Education Corporation (1994), the courts determined Landmark Education Corporation did not have successor-liability to Werner Erhard & Associates, the corporation whose assets Landmark Education purchased.

According to Steven Pressman in the 1993 book Outrageous Betrayal, Landmark Education agreed to pay Erhard a long-term licensing fee for the material used in the Forum and other courses. Erhard stood to earn up to $15 million over the next 18 years." However, Arthur Schreiber's declaration of May 3, 2005 states: "Landmark Education has never paid Erhard under the license agreements (he assigned his rights to others)."

In 2001, New York Magazine reported that Landmark Education's CEO Harry Rosenberg said that the company had bought outright Erhard's license and his rights to the business in Japan and Mexico. From time to time, Erhard acts as a consultant with Landmark Education.

Further reading
Bartley, William Warren III: Werner Erhard The Transformation of a Man: The Founding of est, New York: Clarkson N. Potter Inc. (1978) ISBN 0-517-53502-5.

Speaking Being: Werner Erhard, Martin Heidegger, and a New Possibility of Being Human, Hyde, Bruce and Drew Kopp: Wiley (2019) ISBN 978-1119549901.

"Being Well" Chapter 5 in Beyond Health and Normality: Explorations of Exceptional Psychological Well-Being, edited by Roger Walsh and Deane H. Shapiro Jr., Van Nostrand. 1983.

"est: Communication in a Context of Compassion" with Victor Gioscia, The Journal of Current Psychiatric Therapies, Volume 18. 1978.

The est Standard Training with Victor Gioscia. Biosciences Communication 3:104-122. 1977.

Works
Creating Leaders: An Ontological/Phenomenological Model with Michael C. Jensen, Chapter 16 in Handbook For Teaching Leadership: Knowing, Doing, and Being, edited by Scott A. Snook, Rakesh Khurana, and Nitin Nohria, Harvard Business School. SAGE Publications, 2012 

Four Ways of Being that Create the Foundations of A Great Personal Life, Great Leadership and A Great Organization with Michael C. Jensen, Jesse Isidor Straus Professor of Business Administration, Emeritus Harvard Business School, 2013 

The Hunger Project Source Document, The End of Starvation: Creating an Idea Whose Time Has Come 1977 

Integrity: A Positive Model that Incorporates the Normative Phenomena of Morality, Ethics and Legality with Michael C. Jensen, and Steve Zaffron. Harvard Business School NOM Working Paper No. 06-11; Barbados Group Working Paper No. 06-03; Simon School Working Paper No. FR 08-05.

Putting Integrity Into Finance: A Purely Positive Approach with Michael C. Jensen. Journal: Capitalism and Society, Issue 12, Volume 1, May 2017; National Bureau of Economic Research (NBER) #19986, March 2014;[82] European Corporate Governance Institute (ECGI) Finance Working Paper No. 417/2014; and Harvard Law School Forum on Corporate Governance and Financial Regulation.

See also
 Large-group awareness training

References

External links

 
 Werner Erhard's Author Page at SSRN (Social Science Research Network)

 
1935 births
Episcopalians from Pennsylvania
American people of Jewish descent
Living people
MIT Sloan School of Management faculty
People from Montgomery County, Pennsylvania
Writers from Philadelphia